Angus Chisholm (1908–1979) was a Canadian Cape Breton fiddler. He was the son of Archie Chisholm and Isabel MacLennan.

He was one of the first fiddlers from the island to record a commercially available album. Decca released the recording 14004 on November 18, 1934: Rothermarches Rant, Braes of Auchertyre, Moonlight Clog & Hennessey Hornpipes.

He was regarded as one of the world's best Celtic fiddlers.  He performed on the John Allan Cameron show with the Cape Breton Symphony, a group of fiddlers that included Winston "Scotty" Fitzgerald, Jerry Holland, Joe Cormier, Wilfred Gillis and John Donald Cameron. The group appeared regularly on CBC television on The John Allan Cameron Show and other programs.

Chisholm was born in Margaree Forks, Cape Breton, Nova Scotia in 1908. He died in the United States in 1979 and was laid to rest in Margaree.  His early recordings have now been released on tape.

References 

Date of birth missing
1908 births
1979 deaths
Date of death missing
Place of death missing
Canadian male violinists and fiddlers
Cape Breton fiddlers
Musicians from Nova Scotia
20th-century Canadian violinists and fiddlers
20th-century Canadian male musicians